The National Space Defense Center (NSDC) is a subordinate center of United States Space Command's Joint Task Force–Space Defense. It is responsible for coordinating military, intelligence, civil, and commercial space for unified space defense operations. The NSDC is located at Schriever Space Force Base, outside of Colorado Springs.

Mission
The National Space Defense Center integrates Department of Defense, multiple agencies, and Intelligence Community personnel and authorities to enable unified space defense. The National Space Defense Center executes mission orders received from the joint space tasking order (JSTO) and NRO space tasking order.

History

Initially established as the Joint Interagency Combined Space Operations Center (JICSpOC) on 1 October 2015, it was intended to improve processes and procedures, ensuring data fusion among DoD, intelligence community, interagency, allied and commercial space entities.

On 1 April 2017, the JICSpOC was renamed the National Space Defense Center, to better clarify its role and eliminate confusion with the Joint Space Operations Center (JSpOC).

On 9 July 2019, the NSDC dedicated its operations floor and a warfighter library to Senior Master Sergeant Harold Robert Mosley II. Mosley was the NSDC's Senior Enlisted Leader in 2018. He died on 23 November 2018 in a rock climbing accident.

List of commanders

See also
Combined Space Operations Center

References

Joint military units and formations of the United States
Military units and formations established in 2015
Space units and formations of the United States
Centers of the U.S. Department of Defense